, better known by his stage name TAKURO, is a Japanese musician and lyricist best known as one of the guitarists and leader of the rock band Glay, for which he is also the main composer and lyricist. As a musician and composer, Takuro has worked with different artists and has also released solo works.

Takuro and his older sister were raised by a single mother, as she never remarried after his father's death, when Takuro was three years old. He considers his mother an early influence in his musical career, as he was strongly impressed by her singing.

Biography

History

Later on, during his adolescence, he would be influenced by John Lennon, and would develop a great interest in writing lyrics. His lyrics are often based on his feelings about different situations in his life, as well as events in the world.

Takuro often expresses his opinion on different issues, and has been invited to write about different topics by newspapers. In 2007 he wrote a series of articles about his homeland, Hakodate for the Asahi newspaper. In 2006, he was quoted in an article about new concepts of Japanese family models in the Mainichi website. Being raised in a single mother family, he expressed his personal experience.

In 2001, together with Ryuichi Sakamoto, Takuro started the "Artists Power", an organization that brings together musicians interested in being active in the search of alternative energy.  The EXPO 2001 concert in Ishikari, Hokkaido, had part of its energy generated by alternative fuel and a booth displaying the generators could be seen.

In 2003 Takuro released "Kyoukai", an auto-biographical book, in which he writes about his personal life and his musical work. The topics are his childhood in Hakodate and his career; among the subjects is a mysterious woman who he loved for ten years and who turned him down when he proposed marriage to her and for whom he wrote many of his love songs.

In 2005, Takuro ended his radio show on Tokyo FM, "Glay Radio Communication DX", which he had started in 2003. Previously, he hosted another show, "Takuro Radio Factory".

Personal life
Takuro married the Japanese model Seri Iwahori in May 2004. He was introduced to her during the shooting of the movie Casshern, in which he made a short cameo with Hisashi in 2003. They have a son, born in October 2005 and a daughter, born in October 2007. They own a house in Los Angeles, California and also one in Tokyo.

Solo albums

Album: Instrumental Collection
artist: TAKURO
release date: September 19, 1998
 Tracks:
 HOWEVER
 SOUL LOVE
 Yes, Summerdays
 Ikiteku Tsuyosa
 Miyako Wasure
 a Boy~Zutto Wasurenai~
 Kuchibiru
 Manatsuno Tobira
 Zutto Futari de...
 Glorious
 Yuuwaku
 BELOVED

Album: FLOW of SOUL vol 1. Takuro meets Vanessa Mae
artists: Takuro and Vanessa Mae
release date : April 24, 2002
 tracks:
 Way of Difference
 Francis Elena　featuring Vanessa Mae　
 Zutto Futtari de・・
 Glorious
 a Boy ～zutto wasurenai～
 Kanojo no "Modern・・・"
 HOWEVER
 I'm in Love
 Yuuwaku
 Biribiri crashman
 Sen no naifu ga mune wo sasu
 Pure Soul

Stealth

Takuro and Toki, from Japanese band C:4, have collaborated under the name "Stealth". Together they released the single "Re-lax" on September 25, 2002. In May 2009 they played live for the first time, with other well-known musicians. On October 13, 2010, Stealth released the song "-Sickbed-" digitally on their own website. They also announced the release of their first album "Alstroemeria", but didn't provide detailed information on this record.

Songwriting for other artists

"Summer Shakes" and "I believe you"
Single: Summer Shakes
artist:Miju
"Mitsumeteitai" and "Moon~ watashi he" 
Single: Mitsumeteitai
Artist:ROMI
"Couples" and "Love Is Always Trouble"
Single: Couplesartist: Miju"Love Clover" and "Empty Pocket"Single: Love Clover
artist: Miho Nakayamakokoro ni amegaSingle: kokoro ni amega
artist: Hideki OhtokuFairylandSingle: Fairyland
artist: Yuki Koyanagi
(under the pseudonym "L. Soul")Rhythm to RuleSingle: Rhythm to Rule
artist: Ryoko Shinohara
(composed the music under the pseudonym "L. Soul")"Drama" and "Time Limit"Album: Distance
artist: Hikaru Utada
(composed the music with Utada Hikaru under the name "Kubo Takuro". "Time Limit" was also released as a single)Sweet Seasonsingle: Sweet Season
artist: SONO
(composed the music under the pseudonym "L.Soul")EngagedAlbum: Hana
artist: Tak Matsumoto
(music by Takuro and Tak Matsumoto)LovebiteAlbum: Style
artist: Namie AmuroFuyu no etorageAlbum: Singer for Singer
artist: Misia
(theme song for the movie Umineko, with backing vocals by TERU)RutenAlbum: Romantic Energy
artist: Joshijunigakubo (Twelve Girls Band)Kiss from a RoseAlbum: Sing and Roses
artist: Misato Watanabe
(music)"Hitoiro" and "Eyes for the Moon"Single: Hitoiro
artist: Nana starring Mika Nakashima
("Hitoiro" is theme song for the movie Nana 2 and "Eyes for the Moon" is in the movie's sound track).Say SomethingAlbum: In the Mood
artist: Kyosuke Himuro
(lyrics)Go ahead!!!Single: Go Ahead!!!
artist: Mitsuhiro Oikawa
(music)Koi Suru KimochiSingle:Koi Suru Kimochi
Artist:Emi Takei
(Takei's debut single)

Special featuresSingle: Bridge over troubled waterartist: Junko
song: Together (guitar)Album: Poetic Evolutionartist: Yukinojo Mori
song: Ango (with HISASHI and TERU)single: ZERO LANDMINE
artist: N.M.L.(NO MORE LANDMINE)
song: ZERO LANDMINE (guitar)

Album: Kuzu Album
artist: Kuzu
song: ai nante (with TERU)

Album: In the Mood
artist: Kyosuke Himuro
 song: Say Something (with GLAY)

Books

Along the Line: photobook made in Africa.
Kyoukai (2003): autobiography.
"Super Stars" (November 2006): photobook by Leslie Kee. Takuro was one of the three hundred famous Asian people featured in the book.
Hokkaido e (July 2008): includes a series of articles written by Takuro, along with articles by other authors, originally published by Asahi Newspaper in 2007.

References

External links
 GLAY official website

Japanese rock guitarists
Visual kei musicians
Japanese songwriters
Glay members
Musicians from Hokkaido
People from Hakodate
1971 births
Living people
21st-century guitarists